Eumastacoidea is a superfamily within the order Orthoptera, suborder Caelifera. The family has a mainly tropical distribution and have sometimes been called "monkey grasshoppers".

Description
Some of the characters of the members of the superfamily are the lack of an abdominal tympanum, wings if present widen towards the tip, the antennae are short in some groups the hindlegs are spread out laterally at rest.

Families

The overall classification based on characteristics of the genitalia and the geographic distribution of family groups are as follows:
 Family Chorotypidae 
 Subfamily Chininae 
 Subfamily Chorotypinae 
 Subfamily Erianthinae 
 Subfamily Eruciinae 
 Subfamily Mnesicleinae  
 Subfamily Prionacanthinae  
 Family Episactidae 
 Subfamily Episactinae 
 Subfamily Espagnolinae  
 Subfamily Miraculinae 
  Family Eumastacidae
 Subfamily Eumastacinae 
 Subfamily Gomphomastacinae  
 Subfamily Masynteinae 
 Subfamily Morseinae 
 Subfamily Paramastacinae  
 Subfamily Parepisactinae 
 Subfamily Pseudomastacinae  
 Subfamily Temnomastacinae 
  Family Euschmidtiidae
 Subfamily Euschmidtiinae 
 Subfamily Pseudoschmidtiinae 
 Subfamily Stenoschmidtiinae 
  Family Mastacideidae 
 Subfamily Mastacideinae 
 Family Morabidae 
 Monotypic subfamily Biroellinae 
 genus Biroella 
 Subfamily Morabinae 
 Family †Promastacidae 
 Genus †Promastax 
 Family Thericleidae 
 Subfamily Afromastacinae 
 Subfamily Barythericleinae 
 Subfamily Chromothericleinae 
 Subfamily Loxicephalinae 
 Subfamily Plagiotriptinae 
 Subfamily Thericleinae 

The genus †Promastacoides was originally considered a privative Eumastacoidea taxon by Kevan and& Wighton (1981), subsequent authors have consistently found it to be a Susumaniidae stick insect.

References

External links

 Orthoptera species file

Caelifera
Insect superfamilies